Vyšný Orlík is a village and municipality in Svidník District in the Prešov Region of north-eastern Slovakia.

History

The village was first mentioned in 1414 and had various names throughout history such as Felsoodor (1907-1913) and later, Vyšný Orlík.  The Greek Catholic church of the Accession of the Lord was established in 1793 and this village is predominantly Carpatho-Rusyn Greek Catholic.

A more detailed history with photographs can be found at....

Vyšný Orlík - The Carpathian Connection

Geography
The municipality lies at an altitude of 283 metres and covers an area of 14.716 km². It has a population of about 413 people.

References

External links
 
 

Villages and municipalities in Svidník District
Šariš